Mohammad Rawas or Mohammad El Rawas (born 1951 in Beirut, Lebanon) is a Lebanese painter and printmaker. He studied arts at the Lebanese University, then moved to London and studied Printmaking at the Slade School of Fine Art. He currently lives and works in Beirut, where he taught at the Lebanese University and the American University of Beirut.

Life and work
Rawas began his artistic career with the outbreak of the Lebanese Civil War. He left the country to Damascus, then to Morocco before returning to Lebanon and leaving again to pursue his studies in London. During the late 1970s and early 1980s he produced a body of prints related to the war and to violence in general. These works were presented at several exhibitions, including “The Road to Peace”, curated by Saleh Barakat at the Beirut Art Center.

From the 1980s and 1990s, Rawas developed a painting practice based on constructions with balsa wood, aluminum and string meticulously built up over portions of canvas. His complex artworks widely use reference to popular culture (manga, comics) and old master paintings such as  Las Meninas by Diego Velázquez. In 2013 El Rawas abandons painting to work on creating a series of three-dimensional constructions using multiple materials and techniques. In his latest artistic phase, he goes back to two-dimensional paintings.

For the 2007 Alexandria Biennale, Rawas produced his first installation: Sit Down, Please. The artwork is a multimedia device inspired by a quote from 8th century poet Abu Nuwas related to love and desire within Arab societies.

Magical Realism is what best describes El Rawas’ complex constructions. Each one of his compositions is a layered assemblage of objects and techniques, ideas and references. He borrows, modifies, alters, copies, pastes, reinterprets and decontextualizes objects and concepts he finds in the history of art from Italian renaissance to contemporary art, through haute couture and fashion, comics, architecture and photography.

Auctions

In October 2008, a painting from 1974, Souk El-Franj, Bab Idriss (Beirut Vegetable Market), was presented with a $40,000 - $60,000 estimate and hammered for $56,250.  The mixed media work One Flew Over The Cuckoo's Nest was proposed in April 2011 for $25,000 - $30,000 and sold for $42,500. Later that year, A La Recherche Du Temps Perdu realized $25,000 with a $25,000 - $35,000 estimate.

Awards
Prize of the 24th Alexandria Biennale of the Mediterranean Countries. Alexandria, Egypt.
Honorable Mention at the Ninth Norwegian International Print Triennale, Fredrikstad, Norway, 1989
Prize of Honor, Cabo Frio International Print Biennale, Brazil, 1985
 Third Prize at The First Contemporary Arab Art Exhibition, Centre d'Art Vivant de la Ville de Tunis, Tunisia, 1984
Honorable Mention, Third World Biennale of Graphic Art, Iraqi Cultural Center, London, 1980

Publications
 Maker of Realities (with Antoine Boulad, 2011)
 The Art of Rawas, (Saqi Books, 2004)
 M. El Rawas (Antoine Boulad, Platform Gallery, 1991)

Exhibitions

Solo exhibitions
Saleh Barakat Gallery, Beirut, 2019
Agial Art Gallery, Beirut, 2016
Art Sawa Gallery, Dubai, 2010
Aida Cherfan Fine Art, Beirut, 2007
Janine Rubeiz Gallery, Beirut, 2004
Janine Rubeiz Gallery, Beirut, 2000
Janine Rubeiz Gallery, Beirut, 1997
Janine Rubeiz Gallery, Beirut, 1995
Platform Gallery, Beirut, 1991
Kufa Gallery, London, 1990
Rencontre Art Gallery, Beirut, 1979

Group exhibitions
 Art from Lebanon, Beirut Exhibition Center, 2012
Q Calling the Shots, vol 3. The Digital Age, Q Contemporary, Beirut, 2011
 Rebirth, Lebanon 21st Century Contemporary Art, Beirut Exhibition Art Center, Beirut, 2011
Convergence, New Art from Lebanon, The American University Museum, Katzen Arts Center, Washington DC, 2010
The Road to Peace, Painting in times of war. 1975-1991 Beirut Art Center, Beirut, 2009
Virtuellement réel: Reflection, in contemporary painting and photography. Alice Mogabgab Gallery, Beirut, 2009
The Responsive Hand, Drawings 1, Maqam Gallery, Beirut, 2009
24th Alexandria Biennale of the Mediterranean Countries. Alexandria, 2007
Word into Art, Artists of the Modern Middle East. The British Museum, London, 2006
First Beijing International Art Biennale, 2003
Tokyo Mini Print Biennale, 2002
Ninth International Graphic Artists, Trondheim Art Center, Trondheim, 1998
Eighth Asian Art Biennale, Dacca, 1997
Kraków International Print Triennale, 1997
Contemporary Lebanese Artists, Sharjah Art Museum, 1996
Eighteenth Alexandria Biennale, 1993
First International Print Biennale, Maastricht, 1993
Liban, Le Regard des Peintres, Institut du Monde Arabe, Paris, 1989
Lebanon, The Artist's View, Concourse Gallery, Barbican Center, 1989
Ninth Norwegian International Print Triennale, Fredrikstad, Norway, 1989
Presence de la Gravure, Centre d'Art Vivant de la Ville de Tunis, 1988
Contemporary Lebanese Artists, Kufa Gallery, London, 1988
Contemporary Arab Art, The Mall Galleries, London, 1986
Cabo Frio International Print Biennale, Brazil, 1985
Slade Folio Show, Greenwich Theatre Art Gallery, London, 1981

References

External links
Website of Mohammad Rawas
 Mohammad Rawas at Galerie Janine Rubeiz

Lebanese painters
Artists from Beirut
1951 births
Living people
Lebanese University alumni
Academic staff of Lebanese University
Academic staff of the American University of Beirut
Alumni of the Slade School of Fine Art
Lebanese emigrants to Syria
Lebanese contemporary artists